Tony Ince (born 1958) is a Canadian politician, who was elected to the Nova Scotia House of Assembly in the 2013 provincial election, representing the electoral district of Cole Harbour for the Nova Scotia Liberal Party where he defeated the incumbent, Premier Darrell Dexter.

Early life and education
Ince was born in Halifax and worked as counsellor with the Department of Community Services. He also worked as a project coordinator with the Black Educators Association.

Political career
Ince ran in the 2009 provincial election losing to Dexter. He was elected in the 2013 provincial election.

On October 22, 2013, Ince was appointed to the Executive Council of Nova Scotia where he served as Minister of Communities, Culture and Heritage as well as Minister of African Nova Scotian Affairs and the Minister responsible for the Heritage Property Act.

Ince was re-elected in the 2017 election. On June 15, 2017, premier Stephen McNeil shuffled his cabinet, moving Ince to Minister of the Public Service Commission, while keeping the Minister of African Nova Scotian Affairs portfolio.

Electoral record

|-
 
|Liberal
|Tony Ince
|align="right"| 4,002
|align="right"| 41.03
|align="right"|N/A
|-
 
|New Democratic Party
|Darrell Dexter
|align="right"| 3,981
|align="right"| 40.82
|align="right"|N/A
|-
 
|Progressive Conservative
|Greg Frampton
|align="right"| 1,769
|align="right"| 18.14
|align="right"|N/A  
|}

|-
 
|New Democratic Party
|Darrell Dexter
|align="right"|5,847
|align="right"|68.83
|align="right"|
|-
 
|Liberal
|Tony Ince
|align="right"|1,519
|align="right"|17.88
|align="right"|
|-
 
|Progressive Conservative
|Mike Josey
|align="right"|930
|align="right"|10.95
|align="right"|
|-

|}

References

External links
Members of the Nova Scotia Legislative Assembly
Liberal caucus profile

Living people
Nova Scotia Liberal Party MLAs
People from Cole Harbour, Nova Scotia
Members of the Executive Council of Nova Scotia
21st-century Canadian politicians
Black Canadian politicians
1958 births